Floyd Myron "Rube" Kroh (August 25, 1886 in Friendship, New York – March 17, 1944 in New Orleans, Louisiana), was a professional baseball player who pitched in the Major Leagues from 1906 to 1912. He played for the Boston Braves, Boston Americans, and Chicago Cubs. He is generally credited as the player who got the ball into the hands of Johnny Evers in the famous Merkle's Boner game.

External links

1886 births
1944 deaths
Major League Baseball pitchers
Baseball players from New York (state)
Boston Red Sox players
Boston Braves players
Chicago Cubs players
Coudersport Giants players
Albany Senators players
Johnstown Johnnies players
Louisville Colonels (minor league) players
Chattanooga Lookouts players
Memphis Chickasaws players
Nashville Vols players
Dayton Veterans players
Galveston Pirates players
Houston Buffaloes players
Shreveport Gassers players
Wichita Falls Spudders players
Evansville Evas players
People from Friendship, New York